Maharaja Jitendra Narayan Medical College and Hospital (MJNMCH)  (Previously,Coochbehar Government Medical College & Hospital),is a full-fledged tertiary referral Government Medical college cum hospital. It was established in the year 2019. The college imparts the degree Bachelor of Medicine and Surgery (MBBS). Nursing and para-medical courses are also offered. The college is affiliated to West Bengal University of Health Sciences and is recognised by the National Medical Commission. The MJN hospital associated with the college is one of the largest hospitals in the Coochbehar. The selection to the college is done on the basis of merit through National Eligibility and Entrance Test. Yearly undergraduate student intake is 100 from the year 2019.

Courses
Maharaja Jitendra Narayan Medical College & Hospital (MJNMCH), Cooch Behar, West Bengal undertakes education and training of 100 students MBBS courses.

References

External links 
 College Website 

Medical colleges in West Bengal
Affiliates of West Bengal University of Health Sciences
Educational institutions established in 2019
2019 establishments in India